Te Ahukaramū Charles Royal is a New Zealand musician, academic, and Māori music revivalist. He is of Ngāti Whanaunga, Ngāti Raukawa, Ngāti Tamaterā, and Ngā Puhi descent.

He received a Bachelor of Music from Victoria University of Wellington in 1989, followed by a Master of Philosophy in Māori studies from Massey University. He was director of graduate studies and research at Te Wānanga o-Raukawa and professor of indigenous development at University of Auckland.

Royal compiled and edited work by Māori Marsden into The Woven Universe: Selected Writings of Rev. Maori Marsden that was published in 2003 by the Royal Society Te Apārangi and Ngā Pae o te Māramatanga.

In 2013, he was appointed to the MBIE Science Board.

References

Ngāti Raukawa people
Ngāti Tamaterā people
Ngāpuhi people
Victoria University of Wellington alumni
Massey University alumni
Academic staff of the University of Auckland
Academic staff of Te Wānanga o-Raukawa
New Zealand Māori musicians
Living people
Year of birth missing (living people)